David B. Danbom (born 1947) is a historian, author, and was a professor of agricultural history at North Dakota State University, for more than forty years. Danbom spent nine years on the Fargo Historic Preservation Commission. Danbom also served as president of the Agricultural History Society.

Danbom received his degree in history at Colorado State University in 1969, and graduated in 1974, with his Ph.D., from Stanford University. After graduation, he began his teaching career at North Dakota State University, until retiring in 2010.

Danbom, participated in a discussion on the history of the North Dakota Agricultural Experiment Station and its activities, in 1990, and answered questions during the event. He has authored numerous books and articles, focusing on agriculture and the history of agriculture in the rural west, and been the recipient of several teaching awards.

He was a frequent contributor to the Fargo Forum newspaper, writing more than 100 opinion editorial columns, until his retirement, when he and his wife, Karen, moved to Loveland, Colorado.

Selected works

Books
Born in the Country: A History of Rural America, Johns Hopkins University Press, 2017.
Bridging the Distance: common issues of the rural West, co-authored with the Bill Lane Center for the American West, University of Utah, 2015.
Going it Alone: Fargo Grapples with the Great Depression, Minnesota Historical Society Press, 2005.
Fargo, North Dakota: 1870-1940, co-authored with Claire Strom, Arcadia Pub., 2002.
Our Purpose Is to Serve: The First Century of the North Dakota Agricultural Experiment Station, North Dakota Institute for Regional Studies, 1990.
"The World of Hope": Progressives and the Struggle for an Ethical Public Life, Temple University Press, 1987.
The Resisted Revolution: Urban America and the Industrialization of Agriculture, 1900-1930, Iowa State University Press, 1979.

Dissertation Thesis

The Industrialization of Agriculture, Ph.D. Department of History, Stanford University, 1974.

Teaching awards
1985, 1990, 1997 Mortar Board Preferred Professor
1990 Burlington Northern Faculty Achievement Award
1990 Council for the Advancement and Support of Education (CASE) North Dakota Professor of the Year
1998 North Dakota State University Faculty Lectureship Award. 
2002 Arts, Humanities, and Social Sciences Outstanding Educator Award
2013 North Dakota State University College of Liberal Arts, Distinguished Alumnus Award

See also
Borish, Linda J. "Book Reviews." Technology and Culture, Vol. 38, No. 3 (Jul., 1997), pp. 799–801.
Beltman, Brian W. The Journal of Southern History, Vol. 63, No. 1 (Feb., 1997), pp. 220–222.

References

1947 births
Living people
21st-century American historians
American male non-fiction writers
North Dakota State University faculty
Writers from Fargo, North Dakota
Journalists from North Dakota
20th-century American journalists
American male journalists
21st-century American male writers